The 2019 Australian Open (officially known as the Crown Group Australian Open 2019 for sponsorship reasons) was a badminton tournament which took place at Quaycentre in Sydney, Australia, from 4 to 9 June 2019 and had a total purse of $150,000.

Tournament
The 2019 Australian Open was the twelfth tournament of the 2019 BWF World Tour and was also a part of the Australian Open championships which has been held since 1975. This tournament was organized by the Badminton Australia and sanctioned by the BWF.

Venue
This international tournament was held at Quaycentre in Sydney, Australia.

Point distribution
Below is the point distribution table for each phase of the tournament based on the BWF points system for the BWF World Tour Super 300 event.

Prize money
The total prize money for this tournament was US$150,000. Distribution of prize money was in accordance with BWF regulations.

Men's singles

Seeds

 Chou Tien-chen (semi-finals)
 Anthony Sinisuka Ginting (final)
 Jonatan Christie (champion)
 Kenta Nishimoto (first round)
 Kanta Tsuneyama (first round)
 Sameer Verma (second round)
 Tommy Sugiarto (quarter-finals)
 Lin Dan (quarter-finals)

Wild card
Badminton Australia awarded a wild card entry to Daniel Fan.

Finals

Top half

Section 1

Section 2

Bottom half

Section 3

Section 4

Women's singles

Seeds

 Nozomi Okuhara (final)
 Chen Yufei (champion)
 P. V. Sindhu (second round)
 Ratchanok Intanon (semi-finals)
 Sung Ji-hyun (quarter-finals)  
 Beiwen Zhang (second round)
 Li Xuerui (second round)
 Michelle Li (quarter-finals)

Wild card
Badminton Australia awarded a wild card entry to Chen Hsuan-yu.

Finals

Top half

Section 1

Section 2

Bottom half

Section 3

Section 4

Men's doubles

Seeds

 Takeshi Kamura / Keigo Sonoda (final)
 Li Junhui / Liu Yuchen (semi-finals)
 Mohammad Ahsan / Hendra Setiawan (quarter-finals)
 Fajar Alfian / Muhammad Rian Ardianto (first round)
 Hiroyuki Endo / Yuta Watanabe (first round)
 Han Chengkai / Zhou Haodong (quarter-finals)
 Liu Cheng / Zhang Nan (withdrew)
 Liao Min-chun / Su Ching-heng (quarter-finals)

Wild card
Badminton Australia awarded a wild card entry to Simon Leung / Mitchell Wheller.

Finals

Top half

Section 1

Section 2

Bottom half

Section 3

Section 4

Women's doubles

Seeds

 Mayu Matsumoto / Wakana Nagahara (quarter-finals)
 Yuki Fukushima / Sayaka Hirota (champions)
 Chen Qingchen / Jia Yifan (final)
 Misaki Matsutomo / Ayaka Takahashi (semi-finals)
 Greysia Polii / Apriyani Rahayu (semi-finals) 
 Lee So-hee / Shin Seung-chan (quarter-finals)
 Shiho Tanaka / Koharu Yonemoto (first round)
 Du Yue / Li Yinhui (second round)

Finals

Top half

Section 1

Section 2

Bottom half

Section 3

Section 4

Mixed doubles

Seeds

 Wang Yilyu / Huang Dongping (champions)
 Yuta Watanabe / Arisa Higashino (semi-finals)
 Chan Peng Soon / Goh Liu Ying (quarter-finals)
 Hafiz Faizal / Gloria Emanuelle Widjaja (quarter-finals)
 Seo Seung-jae / Chae Yoo-jung (first round)
 Praveen Jordan / Melati Daeva Oktavianti (final)
 Chris Adcock / Gabby Adcock (quarter-finals)
 He Jiting / Du Yue (second round)

Wild card
Badminton Australia awarded a wild card entry to Simon Leung / Gronya Somerville.

Finals

Top half

Section 1

Section 2

Bottom half

Section 3

Section 4

References

External links
 Tournament Link
 Official Website

Australian Open (badminton)
Australian Open
Badminton
Australian Open (badminton)